Shamim Ara (22 March 1938 – 5 August 2016) was a Pakistani film actress, director and  producer. She was known as The Tragic Beauty because of the tragic heroine roles she often portrayed in films. She was one of the most popular actresses of her time and was one of the most successful actresses of the 1960s, 1970s, 1980s and 1990s. She is regarded as one of the most influential actresses of all time in Pakistani cinema.

Early life
She was born Putli Bai in Aligarh, British India in 1938 but later adopted the film name Shamim Ara. Her acting career spans from the late 1950s till the early 1970s. She is best known for her leading role in the then West Pakistan's first color motion picture Naila (1965 film), released on 29 October 1965, whereas the first full length color motion picture was Sangam (1964 Urdu film) which was produced in the then East Pakistan and released on 23 April 1964.

Career
In 1956, Putli Bai's family was visiting some relatives in Lahore, Pakistan, when after a chance meeting with the well-known film director, Najam Naqvi, she was signed for his next movie. He was searching for a new face for his film Kanwari Bewah (1956) and was impressed by her cute face, sweet voice, approachable personality and innocent yet inviting smile. It was Najam Naqvi who introduced her under the stage name Shamim Ara, because her previous name was similar to the infamous dacoit Putli Bai. Though the film did not attract many viewers, a noticeable new female star had appeared on the horizon of the Pakistan film industry.

She had her first prominent role in 1958 in Anwar Kamal Pasha's Anarkali as a Surayya alongside Noor Jehan who played the titular Anarkali. For the next two years, Ara went on to star in a few films, but none of them were a major success at the box office including Waah Re Zamanay, Raaz and Alam Ara. However, in 1960, a substantial role in S. M. Yusuf's Saheli as an amnesiac bride proved to be a breakthrough for her career. The filming of the song Mujh Se Pehli Si Mohabbat Mere Mehboob Na Maang (a poem written by renowned Pakistani poet Faiz Ahmed Faiz and sung by Madam Noor Jehan) with Rasheed Attre's music in the film Qaidi (1962), had everyone talking about her. Women had begun mimicking her speech, her make-up and her hairstyle. She had become a household name. Her fame and impeccable acting skills landed her the title character in the film Naila (1965), the first color film produced in the then West Pakistan. Her portrayal of the tragic Naila won her further critical acclaim. She went on to star in many hit films including Devdas, Doraha, Hamraz. However, Qaidi (1962), Chingari (1964), Farangi (1964), Naila (1965), Aag Ka Darya (1966), Lakhon Mein Aik (1967), Saiqa (1968) and Salgirah (1968) were landmarks in her career securing her a position as the top actress of the 1960s in Lollywood. 

Her acting career came to a halt when she retired as a leading lady in the early 1970s. But that did not stop her from being a part of the Pakistani film industry as she pioneered to produce and direct films on her own. However, none of those films reached the level of success Shamim Ara had at the height of her acting career.

Jaidaad (1959) and Tees Maar Khan (1989) were the only two Punjabi movies in which she performed.

As a film producer
In 1968, she produced her first film Saiqa (1968 film) which was based on the novel by Razia Butt. The film attracted a large number of viewers especially females.

As a film director
In 1976, for the first time, she directed film Jeo Aur Jeenay Do (1976). Later she also directed the Diamond Jubilee film Munda Bigra Jaye (1995). Other films she directed include Playboy (1978), Miss Hong Kong (1979), Miss Singapore (1985), Miss Colombo (1984), Lady Smuggler (1987), Lady Commando (1989), Aakhri Mujra (1994), Baita (1994), Haathi Mere Saathi, Munda Bigra Jaye (1995), Hum To Chaley Susral (1996), Miss Istanbul (1996), Hum Kisi Say Kum Nahin (1997), Love 95 (1996) and Pal Do Pal (1999). Her directorial ventures were not as successful as her acting projects, primarily due to not dwelling on the real issues and adapting the formula style filmmaking.

Personal life
Shamim Ara was married four times. Her first husband (and perhaps patron) was Sardar Rind, a landlord of Balochistan, who died in a car accident. She then married Abdul Majid Carim, the scion of the family that runs Agfa Color Film Company. They had a son, Salman Majid Carim (who was to be her only child), but the  marriage ended in divorce. Her third marriage was to Fareed Ahmed, a film director and the son of the film director W.Z. Ahmed. That marriage, too, ended in divorce after only 3 days. Shamim Ara later married Pakistani film director and writer Dabeer-ul-Hassan. They lived in Lahore until 2005, when she and Salman Majeed Carim (her son by a previous marriage) moved to London, while her husband remained in Pakistan.

Illness and death
During a visit to Pakistan, she suffered a brain haemorrhage on 19 October 2010, and was taken back to London for treatment. She remained in and out of hospital for six years, and was cared for by her only son, Salman Majid Carim, who has not inherited anything from his father and is self made working in IT industry and also property development. Shamim Ara died on 5 August 2016 in a hospital in London after a very long illness. 

Her only son led the funeral arrangements and she was buried in the UK.

On receiving the news of her death, film actress Resham stated that she only worked with Shamim Ara in a few films but that she left a lasting impression of a soft-spoken and humble person.

Filmography

Film

Awards and recognition

See also
 List of Lollywood actors

References

External links
 

1938 births
People from Aligarh
Pakistani film actresses
Pakistani women film directors
Punjabi-language film directors
Pakistani film producers
Muhajir people
Nigar Award winners
2016 deaths
Film directors from Lahore
Actresses from Lahore
20th-century Pakistani actresses
Pakistani film directors
21st-century Pakistani actresses
Pakistani emigrants to the United Kingdom
Naturalised citizens of the United Kingdom
Urdu-language film directors
Lux Style Award winners